Halloween is a live album by Frank Zappa, released in DVD-Audio format by Vaulternative Records in 2003. It features recordings compiled from various shows at The Palladium, New York City in late October 1978—including a Halloween show on October 31—along with some video content from the same period.

Overview
The set includes a performance of "Ancient Armaments", which appears on the album for the first time in digital form, having previously been included as the B-side to "I Don't Wanna Get Drafted" in 1980. The album cover art resembles the cover art of 1969's Hot Rats.

Track listing 
All tracks by Frank Zappa, except where noted.

Personnel 
 Frank Zappa – lead guitar, vocals
 Denny Walley – guitar, vocals
 Tommy Mars – keyboards
 Peter Wolf – keyboards
 Arthur Barrow – bass guitar
 Patrick O'Hearn – bass guitar
 Vinnie Colaiuta – drums
 Ed Mann – percussion
 L. Shankar – violin (tracks 7 and 13)

References

External links 
 Lyrics and details
 Halloween at zappa.com

Live albums published posthumously
Frank Zappa live albums
2003 live albums